Schnitzer Motorsport was a motorsport team based in Freilassing near Munich, Germany. From the early days of its establishment, the team has operated an automobile racing squad for BMW, and has remarkable results in touring car and sports car racing scenes. The team often runs the cars for BMW under the name of "BMW Motorsport". In 2012, the team operated the DTM team for BMW under the name of "BMW Team Schnitzer".

On 4 December 2020, BMW announced that it will terminate its relationship with Schnitzer Motorsport after more than 50 years.

History 
The team was founded in 1967 by the brothers Josef (August 7, 1939–August 31, 1978) and Herbert Schnitzer (b. June 5, 1941). Their stepfather Karl Lamm had a car repair shop and dealer business. The brothers started racing in 1962, and Josef Schnitzer won the 1966 German Championship in a BMW 2000ti. In 1968, both retired from active race driving to focus on the business and the race team.

In the 1970s, the Schnitzer's younger half-brothers Karl ("Charly") and Dieter Lamm joined the team, with Charly Lamm acting as team manager at the race tracks. In 1978, Josef Schnitzer died in an accident, and Herbert Schnitzer remained as the boss.

Apart from having the BMW dealership and Motorsport team based in Southern Germany's Bavaria, they also own a BMW tuning specialist concern in the far north near the border of Belgium and the Netherlands, in Aachen. As this city has the license plate code AC, they called this branch AC Schnitzer.

Since the 1960s, the Schnitzer team has been mainly active with BMW and BMW M cars in Touring car racing like the European Touring Car Championship, the Deutsche Rennsport Meisterschaft, the Deutsche Tourenwagen Meisterschaft and the World Touring Car Championship (WTCC). In the 2000s, they mainly competed as "BMW Team Germany" in the WTCC with drivers Jörg Müller, Dirk Müller, and Augusto Farfus from 2005 to 2009.

In 1977 and 1978 Schnitzer tried to take on the mighty Porsche 935 in the DRM. They developed a Group 5,  turbocharged silhouette version of the RA40 Toyota Celica and raced it with modest success. The best finish of the Celica LB Turbo was a fourth at Nürburgring in 1977, but with dismal reliability the next year Schnitzer withdrew and returned their focus to BMWs.

Joachim Winkelhock, Pierluigi Martini and Yannick Dalmas won the 1999 24 Hours of Le Mans for Team BMW Motorsport in a BMW V12 LMR, operated by Schnitzer Motorsport.

Schnitzer was also active in Sports car racing and Endurance racing, e.g. the ALMS and Le Mans Series.
On 26 January 2011 it was announced that Schnitzer Motorsport, under the name Team Schnitzer, would run Andy Priaulx's GT2 M3 in the 2011 Intercontinental Le Mans Cup

In 2012, BMW Team Schnitzer, along with BMW Team RBM, and Reinhold Motorsport GmbH, each line up with two BMW M3 DTM cars in the DTM.

In September 2018, Charly Lamm announced that he will step down from his role at Schnitzer at the end of the year. He died unexpectedly on 24 January 2019. In early 2021 the organisation began the process of being liquidated.

Major wins 
 Championships
 1978 Deutsche Rennsport Meisterschaft (Harald Ertl, BMW 320i Turbo)
 1983 European Touring Car Championship (Dieter Quester, BMW 635 CSi)
 1986 European Touring Car Championship (Roberto Ravaglia, BMW 635 CSi)
 1987 World Touring Car Championship (Roberto Ravaglia, BMW M3)
 1988 European Touring Car Championship (Roberto Ravaglia, BMW M3)
 1989 Deutsche Tourenwagen Meisterschaft (Roberto Ravaglia, BMW M3)
 1989-1991 Italian Touring Car Championship (1989: Johnny Cecotto and 1990-1991: Roberto Ravaglia, BMW M3, BMW M3 Evolution)
 1991 Nissan Mobil 500 Series (Emanuele Pirro, Joachim Winkelhock, BMW M3 Evolution)
 1993 British Touring Car Championship (Champion: Joachim Winkelhock and Runner-up: Steve Soper, BMW 318i)
 1994 Asia-Pacific Touring Car Championship (Joachim Winkelhock, BMW 318i)
 1995 Japanese Touring Car Championship (Steve Soper, BMW 318is) and 1995 Super Tourenwagen Cup (Joachim Winkelhock)
 1998 Super Tourenwagen Cup (Johnny Cecotto), BMW 320i
 2001 American Le Mans Series GT (Jörg Müller, BMW M3 GTR V8)
 2012 Deutsche Tourenwagen Masters (Bruno Spengler) (BMW M3 DTM)

 Races
 1976 1000km Nürburgring (Albrecht Krebs, Dieter Quester, BMW 3.5 CSL)
 1985-1986 Spa 24 Hours (Roberto Ravaglia, Gerhard Berger, Marc Surer, Dieter Quester, Altfrid Heger, Thierry Tassin) (BMW 635 CSi)
 1988 Spa 24 Hours (Roberto Ravaglia, Altfrid Heger, Dieter Quester) (BMW M3)
 1988-1991 Wellington 500 (Roberto Ravaglia, Emanuele Pirro, Johnny Cecotto, Joachim Winkelhock, BMW M3, BMW M3 Evolution)
 1990 Spa 24 Hours (Johnny Cecotto, Fabien Giroix, Markus Oestreich, BMW M3 Evolution)  
 1991 24 Hours Nürburgring (BMW M3 Evolution)
 1992 Guia Race (1–2–3 finish, Winner: Emanuele Pirro, Runner-up: Joachim Winkelhock and Third: Roberto Ravaglia, BMW M3 Evolution)
 1992 Pukekohe 500 (Emanuele Pirro, Joachim Winkelhock, BMW M3 Evolution)
 1994 Guia Race (1–2 finish, Winner: Joachim Winkelhock, Runner-up: Steve Soper, BMW 318i)
 1998 24 Hours Nürburgring (BMW 320d)
 1999 24 Hours of Le Mans (BMW V12 LMR)
 2004-2005 24 Hours Nürburgring (1–2 finishes two years in a row, BMW M3 GTR V8)
 2010 24 Hours Nürburgring (Jörg Müller, Augusto Farfus, Uwe Alzen, Pedro Lamy, BMW M3 GT2)
 2018 FIA GT World Cup (Augusto Farfus, BMW M6 GT3)

Complete Deutsche Tourenwagen Masters results
(key)

*  Season still in progress.
† Driver did not finish, but completed 75% of the race distance.

References

External links

  
 The history of the Team Schnitzer - by AC Schnitzer official website

German auto racing teams
BMW in motorsport
World Touring Car Championship teams
World Sportscar Championship teams
24 Hours of Le Mans teams
American Le Mans Series teams
FIA GT Championship teams
Deutsche Tourenwagen Masters teams
British Touring Car Championship teams
European Le Mans Series teams
ADAC GT Masters teams
Blancpain Endurance Series teams
Auto racing teams established in 1967
Auto racing teams disestablished in 2021